The Ordnance QF 95-mm howitzer was a British howitzer built in two versions during the Second World War. The tank howitzer version was accepted for service use, but the infantry version was not.

Design and development
The Ordnance QF 95-mm tank howitzer was designed to be fitted to some later British tanks so they could lay smoke screens or fire HE or HEAT/Hollow Charge shell against concrete targets like pillboxes in the "close support" of infantry. A HESH round may have been issued after World War II. The 95mm howitzer used fixed ammunition with a  projectile, rather than separate charge and round common for artillery howitzers. The tank howitzer was used to arm the Churchill Mark V and VIII, the Cromwell VI & VIII and the Centaur IV tanks. 

The howitzer was built up from a section of a QF 3.7-inch anti-aircraft gun barrel, the breech mechanism of the Ordnance QF 25 pounder field gun/howitzer and the recoil mechanism of the Ordnance QF 6 pounder anti-tank gun. 

The ammunition came from the QF 3.7-inch mountain howitzer; for tank use the rounds had to modified so they were 'fixed' rather than separate projectile and propellant.

The tank howitzer version was also fitted with a large counterweight at the end of the barrel to help balance the gun. In most regiments, the 95-mm-armed tanks were issued to regimental or squadron HQ troops at the rate of two vehicles per HQ.

The only variant of the Centaur tank (a Cromwell tank with a less powerful engine) to see action was the 95 mm armed Mark IV. For the Normandy landings, the Royal Marine Armoured Support Group was formed with an establishment of eighty Mark IVs.

The Ordnance QF 95-mm infantry howitzer was a version built as a conventional towed artillery piece. Perhaps in response to the success of the German sIG 33, a proposal was circulated in the summer of 1942 by the British Army for an infantry howitzer for direct fire against concrete structures, like pillboxes. The 95 mm tank howitzer already under development was considered to be a logical starting point for the design of the new howitzer. The infantry howitzer version was similar to the tank howitzer, except that it lacked the barrel counterweight and was placed on a box-trail carriage and given a gun shield.

Testing in 1943 showed that both the recoil system and the carriage were over stressed and redesign was needed, which delayed testing and introduction of the infantry howitzer until 1944. However, the problems with the recoil mechanism and carriage were never fully ironed out and the weapon was refused by the infantry and declared obsolete in April 1945 but not before several hundred examples were produced.

The decision to reject the infantry howitzer may not have been based entirely on the deficiencies of the gun but due to obsolescence and organizational difficulties. The introduction of the bazooka and recoilless rifles, such as the Burney 3.45-in, may have influenced the decision to refuse the gun since they were lighter, less expensive, portable and fulfilled the direct fire use of the infantry howitzer. Organizationally, there was also the question of who would man the gun; the infantry already had to support and transport anti-tank guns, anti-aircraft guns, mortars and heavy machine guns. Gun crews would need to be trained and provided with services, such as transportation, supply and communications.

Specifications
Name: Ordnance QF 95mm infantry howitzer
Number built: 800
Crew: 6
Calibre: 
Barrel length: 
Weight in action: 
Elevation: -5 to +30 degrees
Traverse: 8 degrees
Rate of fire: 7 rounds per minute
Muzzle velocity: 
Range: 
Ammunition
Smoke: smoke composition
HE: Amatol filling with 12 oz 4 dr (347 g) cordite propellant, No. 119B fuze (direct action and graze type)
HEAT: 50/50 pentolite filling, No 233 Direct Action percussion fuze
HESH:

Notes and references
Notes

Bibliography
Churchill tank Vehicle History and specification, HMSO
Hogg, Ian Twentieth-Century Artillery . p. 175
History Of The Second World War Marshall and Cavendish. p. 2079
Land Power A Modern Illustrated Military History. p. 210
Chamberlain and Ellis, British and American Tanks of World War II 1969 (2nd US Edition 1981 Arco)

External links

95mm Howitzer armed Churchills by S. Osfield

Tank guns of the United Kingdom
World War II artillery of the United Kingdom
95 mm artillery
World War II tank guns